The 1983–84 Scottish Second Division was won by Forfar Athletic who, along with second placed East Fife, were promoted to the First Division. Albion Rovers finished bottom.

Table

References 

Scottish Second Division seasons
3
Scot